Frank Ténot (31 October 1925 – 8 January 2004) was a press agent, pataphysician and jazz critic.  He managed a number of publications over the course of his long association with Daniel Filipacchi. He is best remembered as one of the founders of the influential radio show and magazine Salut les copains.

Life
He discovered jazz in Bordeaux in 1944, where he became president of the Hot Club of France. Based in Paris after World War II, he was employed at the Commission for Atomic Energy, and copy editor at the magazine Jazz Hot, alongside Boris Vian with whom he discovers 'Pataphysics. 
In the 1950s, he worked at the French Club label, with Daniel Filipacchi, then press photographer, and with him among the magazine Jazz Magazine. Until his death, he held a regular column in Jazzman and Jazz Magazine.

They then hosted a radio show on Europe 1, for those who love jazz for sixteen years, from 1955 to 1971. 
In 1959, he began issueing Hi folks, whose great success with youth leads the publication of the magazine of the same name and allows the two partners to create a media group which included Lui, Pariscope, Union and Photo. 
They bought Paris Match in 1976 before joining forces with Matra and take control of creating the Hachette Filipacchi Médias. 
By 1986, Ténot participated in the creation of the Europe 2. 
In 1999, he is the co-founder of TSF Jazz with Jean-François Bizot.

With his partner Daniel Filipacchi, he also tried as lyricist. 
They wrote all the text by adopting the pseudonym Daniel Frank, sung by Henri Salvador on air Lil 'Darlin' by Count Basie. 
They also produced the song Panne d'essence for Sylvie Vartan, under the pseudonym Dan Frank. 
They produced concerts of Miles Davis, Louis Armstrong, and Sylvie Vartan in Olympia.

He presided over a management company, founded Éditions du Layeur and was named "Provveditore" College Pataphysique.

From 1995 to 2001, he was mayor of the town of Marnay-sur-Seine. The Foundation Ténot involved in supporting artistic creation with the art center CAMAC in Marnay-sur-Seine.

Works
    Dictionnaire du jazz, 1967
    Radios privées, radios pirates, 1977
    Jazz encyclopoche, 1977
    Le jazz, 1983
    Boris Vian Jazz à Saint-Germain, 1993
    Je voulais en savoir davantage, 1997
    Frankly speaking : chroniques de jazz, de 1944 à 2004, 2002

References

20th-century French journalists
French publishers (people)
French music critics
Jazz writers
1925 births
2004 deaths
Writers from Mulhouse
French magazine publishers (people)
Pataphysicians
French male non-fiction writers
French radio presenters
20th-century French male writers
Mass media people from Mulhouse